Karpuzlu is a town and district of Aydın Province, in the Aegean region of Turkey,  from the city of Aydın. It became a district centre after separation from Çine in 1990.

Karpuzlu is reached by turning off the road from Aydın to Çine. There is infrequent public transport (by minibus) from both towns to Karpuzlu, which can also be reached by the mountain road from Bodrum or Milas. This latter route is popular with tourists on "jeep safaris" coming to see the ruins of Alinda.

The town is partially situated on the slopes of a hill on the top of which can be seen the well-preserved ruins of the ancient acropolis of Alinda. 

The modern district of Karpuzlu covers part of the Çine plain that is part of the southern reaches of the fertile Menderes River (Meander) valley. The main crops are cotton, corn and many other grains and vegetables. 

Karpuzlu (former Demircidere) itself is a very small town of 2,300 people.

See also
 Alinda
Gülkız Ürbül

References

External links 
 the municipality
 the district governorate

Populated places in Aydın Province
Karpuzlu District
Districts of Aydın Province